Chrysocentris costella is a moth in the  family Glyphipterigidae. It is known from Réunion island in the Indian Ocean.

References

Glyphipterigidae
Moths of Réunion
Endemic fauna of Réunion